Marsha Lisa Thomason Sykes (born 19 January 1976) is a British television and film actress who is best known for playing Sara Evers in Disney's The Haunted Mansion, Nessa Holt in the first two seasons of the NBC series Las Vegas, Naomi Dorrit on the ABC series Lost, FBI agent Diana Berrigan on the USA Network series White Collar and DS Jenn Townsend in ITV crime series The Bay.

Early life
Thomason was born in Moston, Manchester, the daughter of English father Peter Thomason, who worked in politics, and Phyllis (née McCrae), a Jamaican electronics company employee. She attended Holy Trinity Primary School in Harpurhey and North Manchester High School for Girls in Moston, before attending Oldham Sixth Form College to study for A levels in media studies, theatre studies, and performing arts. Thomason attended the Manchester Metropolitan University, receiving a Bachelor of Arts degree in English. From the age of 13, Thomason attended Oldham Theatre Workshop, where she participated in youth theatre productions.

Career
Thomason first came to prominence on British television in the fifth series of Pie in the Sky (1997) playing the waitress, Sally, in eight episodes. She went on to appear in Playing the Field and Where the Heart Is (both 1998), as well as in the first series of the BBC Three drama Burn It (2003). In the United States, she appeared in Disney's The Haunted Mansion, opposite Eddie Murphy. She played Brandy in the film My Baby's Daddy and Victoria in Black Knight. She also played Vicki in Pure. She starred in the U.S. television series Las Vegas as Nessa Holt in seasons one and two, a total of 47 episodes.

On 21 October 2004, she was a guest on the radio show Loveline. In January 2008, she appeared in Messiah V: The Rapture. In August 2008, Thomason was cast as a series regular in the CW show Easy Money. In late 2009, she appeared on General Hospital. After appearing in the pilot episode for White Collar as agent Diana Berrigan, she returned for the first-season finale. It was announced that she would appear on the series full-time in the second season. She is also the new voice of Diana in Hitman: Absolution.

Thomason had the recurring role of Naomi Dorrit on the television show Lost. Being a friend of Dominic Monaghan (who played Charlie Pace on the series), she was a huge fan of the show and excited to be cast. She first appeared in the third-season episode "Catch-22", which aired on 18 April 2007, and continued to appear until the season finale "Through the Looking Glass". She next appeared in "The Beginning of the End" and in the season-five episode "Some Like It Hoth".

In an interview on her role in Lost and whether the actors were provided with information not known to the audience she said, "That's kind of difficult as an actor, but also freeing in a way, because you just have to play the scenes as they're written. And then if you find out if you're a big villain or whatever, then you play that".

Personal life
On 5 April 2009, Thomason married lighting technician Craig Sykes in Malibu, California. Their daughter was born in June 2013. They live in Los Angeles.

Filmography

Film

Television

Video games

References

External links 
 

1976 births
20th-century English actresses
21st-century English actresses
Actresses from Manchester
Alumni of Manchester Metropolitan University
Black British actresses
English expatriates in the United States
English television actresses
People from Moston, Manchester
Living people